The 1996 A-League season was the seventh and final season of the A-League. In 1997, the league merged to form the USISL A-League.

Regular season

A significant number of postponed matches over the 1996 season by the Atlanta Ruckus, who underwent a change in ownership, ultimately forced the A-League to shorten the other teams' schedules by one match, reducing the total games played from 28 to 27.  Atlanta's league position, in last place and already eliminated from the playoff contention, was not affected by the decision announced September 4, 1996.  The Ruckus played a total of 22 games.

Each team had their head-to-head schedule with Atlanta shortened by one, maintaining a balanced head-to-head competition against each other.  The 1996 regular season ended on September 14 with the top four regular season teams advancing to the playoffs.

Playoffs

Bracket

Semifinal 1

Semifinal 2

Final

Points leaders

Honors
 MVP: Wolde Harris
 Leading goal scorer: Doug Miller
 Leading goalkeeper: Paolo Ceccarelli
 Rookie of the Year: Wolde Harris
 Coach of the Year: Lorne Donaldson
 Defender of the Year: John Limniatis
 Official of the Year: Kevin Skinner
First Team All League
Goalkeeper: Paolo Ceccarelli
Defenders: John Limniatis, Wade Webber, Carlos Llamosa, Rene Rivas
Midfielders: Nick DeSantis, Martin Nash, Anthony McCreath
Forwards: Wolde Harris, Domenic Mobilio, Doug Miller

References

External links
 The Year in American Soccer - 1995
 USA - A-League (American Professional Soccer League) (RSSSF)

1996 in American soccer leagues
1996 in Canadian soccer
1996